The Petite rivière Batiscan is a tributary of the east bank of the rivière à Pierre, flowing in the unorganized territories of Linton (township of Tonty), in Saint-Raymond (township of Roquemont) and in the municipality of Rivière-à-Pierre (township of Bois), in the Portneuf Regional County Municipality, in the administrative region of Capitale-Nationale, in the province of Quebec, in Canada.

The course of the Little Batiscan River flows on the northeast side of the Batiscan River and on the northeast side of the St. Lawrence River. This river is part of the hydrographic side of the Batiscan river which generally winds south to the north shore of the St. Lawrence River.

The course of the “Little Batiscan River” descends entirely into the forest zone. The river surface is generally frozen from mid-December until the end of March.

Since the mid-19th century, forestry has been the predominant activity of the Little Batiscan River watershed.

Geography 
The Little Batiscan River has its source in a forest area, at the mouth of Lac à Pierre.
  south-west to the north shore of Petit lac Batiscan;
  towards the Southwest crossing the western part of Little Batiscan Lake, to the mouth located to the south;
  south-west to the limit of the Portneuf Wildlife Reserve;
  to the Southwest, crossing Lake Parke over its full length up to its mouth which corresponds to the limit of the canton of Roquemont;
  Southwest in the Roquemont canton of Saint-Raymond, then in Rivière-à-Pierre, crossing Lac du Coin over its full length, to its mouth;
  south-west, to the confluence of the river.

The Little Batiscan River flows onto the east bank of the Batiscan River in the municipality of Rivière-à-Pierre, in the Portneuf Wildlife Reserve.

The confluence of the "Little Batiscan River" is located at:
  North-East of the center of the village of Rivière-à-Pierre;
  North-East of the confluence of the rivière à Pierre;
  North-West of the center of the village of Saint-Raymond;
  north of the north shore of the St. Lawrence River.

Toponymy 

The toponym "Petite rivière Batiscan" was formalized on December 5, 1968, at the Commission de toponymie du Québec.

See also 
 List of rivers of Quebec

References

External links 

Rivers of Capitale-Nationale